USS Safeguard (ARS-25) was a  in service with the United States Navy from 1944 to 1947 and from 1952 to 1979. She was then transferred to Turkey where she served as TCG Işın (A-589) until 2017.

History
Safeguard was laid down on 5 June 1943 by the Basalt Rock Company in Napa, California; launched on 20 November 1943; and commissioned on 30 September 1944 at the Southern Pacific Docks, Vallejo, California.

United States Navy (1944-1979)

World War II  
 
Following shakedown out of San Diego, California, Safeguard called at San Pedro, California, and San Francisco before commencing the first of many deep water towing operations on 23 December. With YC-1165 and YC-1166 in tow, she arrived at Pearl Harbor on 3 January 1945. Escorted by PC-125Jt and SC-1033, she departed Pearl for Eniwetok on the 15th, this time with ARD-25 in tow. Until 1 March, she operated in the area of Tanapag Harbor.

Safeguard later moved on to the Ryūkyūs. At Okinawa, she conducted at-random salvage operations in the wake of war and typhoons. Although towing operations in Buckner Bay took up much of her time in the months immediately following the end of the war, she also continued salvage work. On 20 November, after continued attempts, she refloated ARD-21, a typhoon victim, at Nago Wan, Okinawa.

Departing the Ryukyus on 28 March 1946 for Shanghai, China, Safeguard extended her salvage and towing capabilities to Taku, China, on 13 April and then to Pusan, Korea, and the Amami-O-Shima Islands. Following several months of operations in Chinese and Japanese waters, she towed YR-68 from Hong Kong to Samar, Philippine Islands, in mid-June. There she added section G of AFDM-5 to her tow and continued on to Pearl Harbor on 29 July in company with three YTBs. The 21st of August found her en route to San Francisco for a three-month overhaul at Mare Island, California.

After service in the Aleutians in the spring of 1947, Safeguard arrived at Pearl Harbor on 1 July. She then went on to Kwajalein Atoll, the Marshalls, for salvage operations after the nuclear tests held there. The mission involved considerable diving and the inspection of the underwater surfaces of many grounded vessels. Safeguard departed Kwajalein on 12 November and headed via Pearl Harbor for San Diego. She decommissioned on 12 December 1947 and entered the San Diego Group of the Pacific Reserve Fleet.

Cold War 
 
After the outbreak of war in Korea, Safeguard was ordered activated. Recommissioned on 13 February 1952, she proceeded to Pearl Harbor for a post-commissioning overhaul that took her into mid-August. She arrived at Sasebo, Japan, on 3 September 1952 and again commenced salvage and towing operations in Japanese and Korean waters.

Between May and December 1953, Safeguard underwent overhaul at Pearl Harbor. Following the end of the Korean War, she continued to engage in fleet salvage operations and regular WestPac deployments. In the summer of 1955 and 1956, she operated out of Seattle, Washington, provisioning DEW-line outposts.

Safeguard relieved  on station in the South China Sea off the coast of South Vietnam on 25 August 1964. Interruptions during this duty took her to Subic Bay and Hong Kong. Arriving at Pearl Harbor on 27 October, she conducted local operations through the following summer. In the first half of 1964 she also assisted in Operation Sailor Hat off the coast of Kahoolawe with target ship moorings. She was again en route to WestPac on 17 August 1965 for operations that took her to Japanese, Korean, and Vietnamese waters.
 
Arriving at Pearl Harbor on 9 March 1966, Safeguard commenced upkeep and mid-Pacific operations. For example, during September and October 1966, she salvaged a 10,000-ton commercial barge which had grounded at Wake Island during a storm. She then towed the barge 2,000 miles to Honolulu. Into 1974, Safeguard has continued to provide Fleet support services from her home port of Pearl Harbor and through her regular WestPac deployments. Safeguard was decommissioned on 25 September 1979.

Turkish Navy (1979-2017) 
Safeguard was transferred under the Security Assistance Program to Turkey on 28 September 1979 and renamed TCG Işın (A-589). She was decommissioned on 30 March 2017. Sunk as target in June 2021 as part of Atmaca anti-ship missile trials.

U.S. Military awards and honors 
 
Safeguard received one battle star for World War II service:
 Okinawa Gunto operations
During the Korean War she received the Presidential Unit Citation and five battle stars. Two are shown below: 
 Korean Defense Summer-Fall 1952
 Third Korean Winter
For service in Vietnam she was reported to have  received nine campaign stars. However, ten are noted below:
 Vietnam Defense
 Vietnamese Counteroffensive
 Vietnamese Counteroffensive - Phase III
 Vietnamese Counteroffensive - Phase V
 Vietnamese Counteroffensive - Phase VI
 Vietnam Winter-Sprint 1970
 Sanctuary Counteroffensive
 Vietnamese Counteroffensive - Phase VII
 Consolidation I
 Vietnamese Ceasefire
Safeguard's crew was eligible for the following medals, citations, ribbons, and other honors (listed in order of precedence):
 Presidential Unit Citation (United States)
 Navy Meritorious Unit Commendation
 China Service Medal (extended)
 American Campaign Medal
 Asiatic-Pacific Campaign Medal (1)
 World War II Victory Medal
 Navy Occupation Service Medal (with Asia clasp)
 National Defense Service Medal (2)
 Korean Service Medal (2)
 Armed Forces Expeditionary Medal (2-Korea)
 Vietnam Service Medal (10)
 Humanitarian Service Medal (1- Entewaktek Cleanup, 1-Boat People)
 Republic of Vietnam Gallantry Cross Unit Citation (3)
 United Nations Service Medal
 Republic of Vietnam Campaign Medal
 Republic of Korea War Service Medal (retroactive)

References

External links 
 NavSource Online: Service Ship Photo Archive - ARS-25 Safeguard

 

Diver-class rescue and salvage ships
Ships built in Napa, California
1943 ships
World War II auxiliary ships of the United States
Ships transferred from the United States Navy to the Turkish Navy